This is a list of Cornish saints, including saints more loosely associated with Cornwall: many of them will have links to sites elsewhere in regions with significant ancient British history, such as Wales, Brittany or Devon.

List of some of the well-known Cornish saints
For more information see the works of Canon Doble (1880–1945),Nicholas Orme's book, The Saints of Cornwall (2000), and the works of Charles Henderson

N.B. All these have dedications in Cornwall but not all have legends or traditions associating them with Cornwall.

Honorary canons of Truro

The 24 honorary canons of Truro Cathedral occupy stalls named after 24 saints (almost all of them Cornish): Carantoc; Buriana; Germoe; Conan; Winwalloe; Nectan; Petroc; Adwenna; Piran; Constantine; Cybi; Paul; Breaca; Neot; Rumon; Sampson; German; Meriadoc; Euni; Ia; Endelienta; Columb; Corentin; Aldhelm.

Modern Cornish saints

More recent Cornishmen recognized for sanctity include the Irish-Cornish martyr Blessed John Cornelius.

See also

 Llan place name element
 List of Welsh saints
 List of saints of the Canary Islands

References
Nicholas Roscarrock (d. 1634) left an interesting account of the lives of the saints.

Further reading
 Orme, Nicholas (1996) English Church Dedications: With a Survey of Cornwall and Devon, University of Exeter Press 
Ellis, P. B. (1992) The Cornish Saints. Penryn: Tor Mark Press (A brief basic guide giving accounts of 120 saints)
 Bowen, E. G. (1954) The Settlements of the Celtic Saints in Wales. Cardiff: University of Wales Press
 Baring-Gould, S.; Fisher, John (1907–13) Lives of the British Saints: the saints of Wales and Cornwall and such Irish saints as have dedications in Britain. 4 vols. London: For the Honourable Society of Cymmrodorion, by C. J. Clark
 Rees, W. J. (ed.) (1853) Lives of the Cambro British Saints: of the fifth and immediate succeeding centuries, from ancient Welsh & Latin mss. in the British Museum and elsewhere, with English translations and explanatory notes. Llandovery: W. Rees
Wade-Evans, A. W. (ed.) (1944). Vitae Sanctorum Britanniae et Genealogiae. Cardiff: University of Wales Press Board. (Lives of saints: Bernachius, Brynach. Beuno. Cadocus, Cadog. Carantocus (I and II), Carannog. David, Dewi sant. Gundleius, Gwynllyw. Iltutus, Illtud. Kebius, Cybi. Paternus, Padarn. Tatheus. Wenefred, Gwenfrewi.--Genealogies: De situ Brecheniauc. Cognacio Brychan. Ach Knyauc sant. Generatio st. Egweni. Progenies Keredic. Bonedd y saint.)

External links
 A - Z of saints by St Patrick's Washington DC

Cornwall
Saints
Saints
Saints